The 1982 Avon Championships of Washington  was a women's tennis tournament played on indoor carpet courts (Sporteze) at the GWU Charles Smith Center and the Capital Centre in Washington D.C., District of Columbia in the United States that was part of the 1982 Avon Championships Circuit. It was the ninth edition of the tournament and was held from January 4 through January 11, 1982. Second-seeded Martina Navratilova won the singles title and earned $40,000 first-prize money.

Finals

Singles
 Martina Navratilova defeated  Anne Smith 6–2, 6–3
 It was Navratilova's first singles title of the year and the 56th of her career.

Doubles
 Kathy Jordan /  Anne Smith defeated  Martina Navratilova /  Pam Shriver 6–2, 3–6, 6–1

Prize money

References

External links
 International Tennis Federation (ITF) tournament edition details

Avon Championships of Washington
Virginia Slims of Washington
1982 in sports in Washington, D.C.
1982 in American tennis
1982 in women's tennis